Liga Portuguesa de Futebol Americano (LPFA) is the name of the top American football league which operates in Portugal.

History

Teams

2017–18

Former

External links 
(in Portuguese)

Por
American football in Portugal
2009 establishments in Portugal
Sports leagues established in 2009